{{DISPLAYTITLE:C26H38N2O4}}
The molecular formula C26H38N2O4 may refer to:

 Alnespirone, a selective 5-HT1A receptor full agonist of the azapirone chemical class
 Mazipredone, a synthetic glucocorticoid corticosteroid